ROP or RoP may refer to:

Science and technology
 Retinopathy of prematurity, a condition of the eyes causing blindness
 Right occiput posterior, in obstetrics
 Ring-opening polymerization, a type of polymerization
 Rop protein, a helical protein found in E. coli

Computing
 Raster Operations Pipeline, graphics processing component
 Raster Operator in a bit blit operation
 Return-oriented programming, an exploit technique
 Role-oriented programming, a programming paradigm

Organizations
 Royal Oman Police, Sultanate of Oman
 Ruch Odbudowy Polski, the Movement for Reconstruction of Poland, a Polish political party

Places
 Rop rock shelter, an archeological site in Nigeria
 Rota International Airport, Northern Mariana Islands, US Commonwealth, IATA code
 Sovereign states with the abbreviation:
 Palau (Republic of Palau)
 Panama (Republic of Panama)
 Paraguay (Republic of Paraguay)
 Peru (Republic of Peru)
 Philippines (Republic of the Philippines)
 Poland (Republic of Poland)

Other uses
 Rate of penetration, in drilling for oil
 Regional Occupational Program
 Reorder point, a term used in supply chain management
 The Lord of the Rings: The Rings of Power, a fantasy TV series based on the works of J. R. R. Tolkien
 Rop (name), name of Kenyan origin

See also
 Rops (disambiguation)